is a novel by Pierre Loti, presented as the autobiographical journal of a naval officer who was temporarily married to a Japanese woman while he was stationed in Nagasaki, Japan. It closely follows the journal he kept of his summer 1885 affair with Kiku (Chrysanthemum) née Kane a few blocks north of Glover Garden in the  neighbourhood; modern day , whence she fled to hometown  due to xenophobia. Originally written in French and published in 1887,  was very successful in its day, running to 25 editions in the first five years of its publication with translations into several languages including English. It has been considered a key text in shaping western attitudes toward Japan at the turn of the 20th century.

André Messager's 1893 opera of the same name is based on it, as are some aspects of Puccini's 1904 opera .

References
Notes

Sources

External links

Audio version of original French
 

1887 French novels
Novels by Pierre Loti
Novels set in Japan
Novels adapted into operas
Fictional Japanese people
Female characters in literature
Japan in non-Japanese culture